The 2001 Meistriliiga was the 11th season of the Meistriliiga, Estonia's premier football league. Flora won their fifth title.

League table

Relegation play-off

2–2 on aggregate. Lootus won on away goals and retained their Meistriliiga spot for the 2002 season.

Results
Each team played every opponent four times, twice at home and twice on the road, for a total of 36 games.

First half of season

Second half of season

Top scorers

References

Meistriliiga seasons
1
Estonia
Estonia